The siege of Marrakesh was led by the brothers of Ibn Tumart, Isa and Abd al-Aziz who rebelled against Abd al-Mu’min and sieged Marrakesh.

Background 
Instead of the succession of Almohad rule being passed on to Ibn Tumart's line known as the Banu Amghar, Abd al-Mu’min made a series of moves to preserve the rule of the Almohad Empire in the hands of his descendants, the Mu’minids who were known as Sayyids. His actions excluded Ibn Tumarts own lineage from supreme rule and confirmed the shift of power from the Masmuda to the Zenata Kumiya, whom were described as the most powerful tribe in the empire by al-Marrakushi.

Abd al-Mu’min appointed several of his sons to major governorships in the place of Almohad shaykhs across the Empire, for instance in Bejaia, Tlemcen, Seville, Granada, Ceuta, Fez, Tadla and Sus thereby inserting a Mu’minid prince in almost every important city within the empire.

Ibn Tumart's brothers Isa and Abd al-Aziz viewed Abd al-Mu’mins foundation of his own dynasty as the final straw eventually leading to a rebellion against the Caliph.

Siege 
By 1154 AD Abd al-Aziz and Isa had been deprived of governorship over Seville and were exiled to Fez, Ibn Idhari stated that this was due to their envy towards Abd al-Mu’min.

Isa and Abd al-Aziz led an uprising in Marrakesh against Abd al-Mu’min which was supported by other Masmuda shaykhs. They planned to kill the governor. A battle took place between them and Abd al-Mu’mins supporters which resulted in a victory for Abd al-Mu’mins side. Both of Ibn Tumarts brothers were killed and a saddlebag containing documents that revealed the name of other conspirators was discovered and these conspirators were hunted down and killed by castration.

References

Marrakesh
Marrakesh